Herland may refer to:
 Doug Herland (1951–1991), 1984 Olympic Bronze Medalist (Rowing)
 Herland (novel), 1915 utopian novel by Charlotte Perkins Gilman
 Hærland, a village in Eidsberg, Norway
 Anna Sofie Herland (1913–1990)
 Hanne Nabintu Herland (born 1966), Norwegian author and debater
 Hugh Herland (1330–1411), 14th-century medieval English carpenter
 Sigmund Herland (1865–1954)

See also 
 Erland